is a Japanese manga artist. He graduated from Tokyo Metropolitan College of Aeronautical Engineering. He is associated with Weekly Shōnen Jump. Dragon Quest: The Adventure of Dai (1989–1996), which he created with writer Riku Sanjo, is one of the best-selling manga in history with over 47 million copies sold. The two also created Beet the Vandel Buster (2002–2006, 2016–present), which has 4 million copies in print.

Inada had been ill since September 2006, which led to the hiatus of Beet the Vandel Buster at volume 12. He made a recovery in 2018 and resumed work on the series.

Selected works
Dragon Quest: Dai no Daibōken Story by Riku Sanjo
Beet the Vandel Buster Story by Riku Sanjo

References

External links
 
 

Manga artists from Tokyo
1964 births
Living people